Georges Bess (born 1947) is a comics artist and comic book creator, best known for his collaborations with Alejandro Jodorowsky.

Biography
Early in his career Bess moved to Sweden in 1970 where he lived for a period, illustrating for publications such as the Swedish Mad magazine sometimes under pseudonyms. During the period 1976 to 1988, Bess productively provided artwork for the serial publication The Phantom distributed by Scandinavian publishers of the popular periodical. 

 
Upon meeting Alexandro Jodorowsky in 1986, Bess began the Franco-Belgian comics phase of his career, and the two formed a productive partnership. Their collaboration began with the fairy tale-themed Les jumeaux magiques (The Magical Twins) for the Franco-Belgian comics magazine Le Journal de Mickey, published as album by Hachette. Bess and Jodorowsky went on to publish a large body of work for publisher Les Humanoïdes Associés for more than a decade. Initially they produced the Tibetan series Lama Blanc, on a subject that had occupied Bess since earlier travels. Their next collaboration was a revival of the series Anibal Cinq previously drawn by Manuel Moro in the 1960s, featuring an android secret agent. Their final project was the violent outlaw series Juan Solo.

Leaving the creative partnership for the opportunity to pursue his own stories, Bess published Escondida in 1998, taking his work in new directions. In 1999 Bess joined Milo Manara and Claire Wendling to illustrate the second tome of Pierre Louÿs' erotic  Aphrodite issued in three volumes.

With his wife Layla Bess he created two albums titled Leela et Krishna in 2000 for publishing house Carabas, portraying ancient India. In 2005, he started the series Pema Ling at publisher Dupuis, revisiting themes of Tibet, most recently the fifth volume Katouk le Tulpa in 2009.

Bess currently lives in the Balearic Islands.

Bibliography

Sources

 Bess dossier of Norwegian Fantomet , and Swedish Fantomen  
 Georges Bess albums Bedetheque 

Footnotes

External links
 Georges Bess biography on Lambiek Comiclopedia
 Georges Bess biography on Dupuis
 Georges Bess biography on Scandinavian Chapter 
 Georges Bess biography on Humanoïdes Associés 

1947 births
Living people
French comics artists
French comics writers
French male writers
French expatriates in Sweden